Greatest Hits is the first greatest hits album, and second compilation album, released by Scottish-Northern Irish alternative rock band Snow Patrol, through Polydor Records on 14 May 2013. Unlike previous compilation album Up to Now, the album does not contain any tracks from before the 2003 release of Final Straw.

Track listing

Charts

References

2013 greatest hits albums
Albums produced by Jacknife Lee
Polydor Records compilation albums
Snow Patrol compilation albums